Aire-sur-l'Adour (or simply ) is a commune in the Landes department, Nouvelle-Aquitaine, southwestern France.

It lies on the river Adour in the wine area of southwest France. It is an episcopal see of the Diocese of Aire and Dax. The nearest large towns are Mont-de-Marsan to the north and Pau to the south.

History
Aire (Atura, Vicus Julii) once was the residence of the kings of the Visigoths. Here in 506 Alaric II drew up his code, the Breviarium Alaricianum.

Famed bullfighter Iván Fandiño died in Aire-sur-l'Adour after being gored by a bull on 17 June 2017.

Sights

Aire Cathedral, built in the 11th century but renovated in the 14th and 17th centuries.
The Gothic church of Sainte-Quitterie is dedicated to Saint Quiteria, who, according to Christian tradition, was beheaded here in the fifth century. This church is on the pilgrimage route called the Way of St. James.

Population

Personalities
 Pierrette Le Pen, mother of Marine Le Pen and ex-wife of Jean-Marie Le Pen
 Florian Cazalot, rugby union player, born 1985 in Aire-sur-l'Adour

Twin towns
 Castro-Urdiales, Spain

References

External links

History of CNES base devoted to launch stratospheric balloons
Image of city's cathedral

Airesurladour
World Heritage Sites in France